The following lists events that happened during 1955 in South Vietnam.

Events

February
 February 12 - United States President Dwight D. Eisenhower sends the first U.S. advisors to South Vietnam.

October
 October 26 - Ngô Đình Diệm proclaims Vietnam to be a republic with himself as its President (following the State of Vietnam referendum on October 23) and forms the Army of the Republic of Vietnam.

November
 November 1 - The Vietnam War begins between the South Vietnam Army and the North Vietnam Army in which the latter is allied with the Viet Cong.

References

 
South
Years of the 20th century in South Vietnam
South Vietnam
1950s in South Vietnam
South Vietnam